Porno for Pyros is the debut album by Porno for Pyros, released on April 27, 1993, on the same label as Jane's Addiction, Warner Bros. Records. Jane's Addiction guitarist Dave Navarro and bassist Eric Avery, battling substance abuse issues, had left the band in 1991 in an attempt to stay clean, though the other half of the band wished to continue creating music. The remaining members of Jane's Addiction, Perry Farrell and Stephen Perkins, were joined by guitarist Peter DiStefano and future Jane's Addiction bassist Martyn LeNoble, and continued under the new band name Porno for Pyros. The band (and album) name is a reference to the 1992 Los Angeles riots, which are mentioned throughout the songs on the album as a recurring theme.

The album was certified Gold in the U.S. by the RIAA and contained the No. 1 Modern Rock single "Pets".

Music
Before the album's release, the musical direction and focus of the band and album were said to be "laid-back", "ethnic-influenced" and "edgy and experimental". This ultimately proved to be inaccurate of Porno for Pyros, though the 1996 follow-up Good God's Urge eventually made good on the assertion. Critics often compared the sound of Porno for Pyros to that of Jane's Addiction upon its release, noting many parallels in song structure and overall sound.

Such comparisons may be unavoidable; three of Porno for Pyros' founding four members (Farrell, Perkins and LeNoble) have either been past or are current members of Jane's Addiction. In addition, a number of songs on Porno for Pyros, namely "Blood Rag" and "Bad Shit", were written during the pre-1992 Jane's Addiction period, although they would remain unfinished and unrecorded until the Porno for Pyros album.

The songs "Cursed Female" and "Cursed Male" were released as the album's first single. The songs appear on the album as two separate tracks. In addition to the two respective album versions, the single also included the two songs together in medley form as a single track. This medley was also released on the album's second (and highest charting) single, "Pets".

Another non-album B-side, "A Little Sadness", was released as a track on Porno for Pyros' fourth and final single, "Sadness". Recorded during the album sessions but left off in favor of its namesake, the song was a complete reworking and rerecording of "Sadness". "A Little Sadness" featured primarily acoustic guitars, subdued vocals, bongos and saxophone, a sharp contrast to its electric progenitor. In an unusual move, a video was created for the B-side rather than the album track.

"Porno for Pyros", "Packin' .25" and "Black Girlfriend" all referenced or were inspired by the 1992 Los Angeles riots.

Track listing

Personnel
Porno for Pyros
Peter DiStefano – guitars
Perry Farrell – vocals
Martyn LeNoble – bass guitars
Stephen Perkins – drums, percussion

Additional musicians
 Skatemaster Tate – sound additives
 Matt Hyde – sound additives

Recording personnel
 Matt Hyde – Production, recording engineer, mixing
 Perry Farrell – Production
 Rob Seifert – Recording engineer
 Damien Wagner – Assistant recording engineer
 Chris Belman – Mastering

Additional personnel
 Tom Recchion – Art direction, design
 Bill Hofstadter – Artwork, photography
 Perry Farrell – Artwork
 Barrie Goshko – Lettering
 Cecil Juanarena – Computer imaging
 Ted Gardner – Management
 Don Muller – Booking agent
 Ted Mico – Publicity

Certifications

Charts

References

Porno for Pyros albums
1993 debut albums
Warner Records albums
Albums produced by Matt Hyde